Ophthalmic means pertaining to the eye, and can refer to:

 Ophthalmology
 Ophthalmic nerve
 Ophthalmic artery
 Ophthalmic veins
 Ophthalmic drug administration, as with eye drops

See also
 Ophthalmia